Bohal is a village in Qeshlaq Rural District, in the Central District of Ahar County, East Azerbaijan Province, Iran. At the 2006 census, its population was 849, in 158 families.

References 

Populated places in Ahar County